Adolphus W. Burtt (May 28, 1832 – January 7, 1917) was an American attorney and politician.  He is most notable for his service in the South Dakota Senate in the early 1890s and as Attorney General of South Dakota in the early 1900s.

Early life
Adolphus William Burtt (sometimes spelled "Burt") was born in New York on May 28, 1832, the son of Warren D. Burtt and Sarah (Fowler) Burtt.  He was educated raised and educated in Watertown and Mendon.  Burtt attended Genesee Wesleyan Seminary, then worked as a bookkeeper.  At the time of the 1860 census, he was living with his wife's family in West Bloomfield, New York.

Start of career
Burtt moved to Pontiac, Michigan, in the mid-1860s.  He studied law, probably under Michael E. Crofoot, whose partner he later became, and was admitted to the bar in 1869.  He was active in politics as a Republican, and ran unsuccessfully for prosecuting attorney of Oakland County and city clerk of Pontiac.  Burtt served as a justice of the peace of Pontiac's municipal court, and afterwards was usually referred to as "Judge Burtt".  After several years of practice as Crofoot & Burtt, in 1877 Crofoot's son Louis joined the firm, which became known as Crofoot, Burtt & Crofoot.

Move to South Dakota
In 1881, Burtt and Louis W. Crofoot were among a large contingent of Pontiac residents who decided to file claims for land grants in the Dakota Territory and move to what is now Beadle County, South Dakota.  Burtt and Louis Crofoot practiced in partnership in Huron, and Burtt served several terms as Huron's city attorney, in addition to running unsuccessfully for mayor.

Burtt won election to the South Dakota Senate in 1892, and served one term, 1893 to 1895.  When Attorney General John L. Pyle died in 1902, Governor Charles N. Herreid appointed Burtt to fill the vacancy, and he served from March 1902 until January 1903.  He was not a candidate for a full term in 1902, and was succeeded by Philo Hall.

From 1906 to 1907, Burtt served as president of the South Dakota Bar Association.  He was also the longtime president of the Beadle County Bar Association.  Burtt was an active member of the Masons and the Elks, and had a reputation as an effective orator, which caused him to be sought out for speeches at political meetings, holiday commemorations, and other events.

Retirement and death
In 1909, Burtt and his wife moved to Kalispell, Montana, so they could reside near their daughter and son-in-law.  He died in Kalispell on January 7, 1917, and was buried at Conrad Memorial Cemetery in Kalispell.

Family
In 1857, Burtt married Emily Elizabeth Beebe (1836-1910) of West Bloomfield, New York.  They were the parents of a daughter, Nellie (1864-1938).  Nellie Burtt was the wife of George A. Fessenden (1863-1910).

Notes

References

Sources

Newspapers

Internet

Books

External links

1832 births
1917 deaths
19th-century American politicians
People from Mendon, New York
Politicians from Pontiac, Michigan
People from Huron, South Dakota
Michigan lawyers
Michigan Republicans
Michigan state court judges
South Dakota Republicans
South Dakota lawyers
South Dakota Attorneys General
South Dakota state senators
Politicians from Kalispell, Montana
Burials in Montana
19th-century American judges
19th-century American lawyers